Romie J. Palmer (April 10, 1921 – December 16, 2014) was an American politician and jurist.

Born in Pontotoc, Mississippi, Palmer served in the United States Army during World War II. He received his law degree from DePaul University College of Law and practiced law in Blue Island, Illinois. Palmer served in the Illinois House of Representatives from 1969 to 1976 and was a Republican. He then served as judge of the Cook County, Illinois Circuit Court.

Notes

External links
The Romie J. Palmer papers-Chronicling Illinois

1921 births
2014 deaths
People from Blue Island, Illinois
People from Pontotoc, Mississippi
DePaul University College of Law alumni
Illinois state court judges
Republican Party members of the Illinois House of Representatives
Military personnel from Mississippi
20th-century American judges
United States Army personnel of World War II